is a passenger railway station located in the city of Ōzu, Ehime Prefecture, Japan. It is operated by JR Shikoku and has the station number "U15".

Lines
Connections with other services are needed to travel further east of Matsuyama on the line.

Layout
The station consists of a side platform serving a single track. There is no station building, only a simple shelter for waiting passengers. A ramp leads up to the platform from the access road. A bike shed is provided near the base of the ramp.

History
Japanese National Railways (JNR) opened the station as an added stop on the existing Yosan Line on 20 October 1961. With the privatization of JNR on 1 April 1987, control of the station passed to JR Shikoku.

Surrounding area
Municipal Ozu Hospital
Ozu City Kume Elementary School

See also
 List of railway stations in Japan

References

External links
Station timetable

Railway stations in Ehime Prefecture
Railway stations in Japan opened in 1961
Ōzu, Ehime